Abell 1185 is a galaxy cluster located in the constellation Ursa Major. It is approximately 400 million light-years away from Earth and spans one million light-years across. It is a member of the Leo Supercluster. One of its brightest galaxies is NGC 3550.

References

 
Ursa Major (constellation)
Leo Supercluster
1185